The Intimacy of the Blues is a studio album by the American pianist, composer and bandleader Duke Ellington, recorded in 1967 and 1970, and released on the Fantasy label in 1986.

Reception

The AllMusic review by Scott Yanow states: "Duke Ellington did a remarkable number of private recordings with small groups taken from his orchestra and the selections included on this CD reissue are some of the best... Excellent music".

Track listing
All compositions by Duke Ellington except as indicated
 "The Intimacy of the Blues" (Billy Strayhorn) - 4:01
 "Out South" - 2:37
 "Tell Me 'Bout My Baby" - 3:19
 "Kentucky Avenue" - 4:01
 "Near North" - 2:36
 "Soul Country" - 2:10
 "Noon Mooning" - 6:04
 "Rockochet" - 4:22
 "Tippy-Toeing Through the Jungle Garden" - 5:55
 "Just A-Sittin' and A-Rockin''" (Ellington, Strayhorn, Lee Gaines) - 3:00
 "All Too Soon" (Ellington, Carl Sigman) - 3:51 
Recorded at RCA Studio B in New York, NY on March 15, 1967 (tracks 1-6), in Las Vegas, Nevada on January 7, 1970 (tracks 7-9)and at National Recording Studio, New York, NY on July 15, 1970 (tracks 10 & 11).

Personnel
Duke Ellington – piano
Wild Bill Davis - organ (tracks 7, 9, & 10)
Cat Anderson (tracks 1-6 & 11), Willie Cook (tracks 7-9) - trumpet 
Lawrence Brown - trombone (tracks 1-9)
Johnny Hodges - alto saxophone (tracks 1-6)
Harold Ashby (track 11), Paul Gonsalves (tracks 1-10) - tenor saxophone
Harry Carney - baritone saxophone (tracks 1-6)
Norris Turney - flute (track 10)
Joe Benjamin (tracks 10 & 11), Victor Gaskin (tracks 7-9), John Lamb (tracks 1-6), Paul Kondziela (tracks 7-9) - bass
Rufus Jones - drums

References

Fantasy Records albums
Duke Ellington albums
1986 albums